Horizon Yacht (often referred to as Horizon Yachts) is a Taiwanese yacht manufacturer headquartered in the city of Kaohsiung. In 2018 Horizon was the tenth largest yacht builder in the world by total feet of yacht delivered.

History 
Horizon Yacht was founded in 1987 by John Lu, Gong Shan Chiai, and Cheng Shun Hui in Kaohsiung. Founded to supply yachts to domestic and American buyers, the company began targeting the European, Australian, and Asian markets in 1989. In the late 2010s expansion of Taiwan's domestic yachting market was beginning to allow Horizon to fulfill its original intention of selling domestically.

In 2019 they infused the hull and stiffeners of a 43m composite yacht in a single shot using vacuum infusion technology and proprietary 3D resin flow.

As of 2020 Horizon had delivered more than 835 yachts.

Yachts

SunOne
SunOne is a 45m superyacht launched in 2012 as Polaris. She is the first and only yacht of the EP 148 class.

Rebecca is a 34m super yacht built launched in 2012, she was an entirely in-house project.

Awards and honors
In 2019 Horizon Yacht won Best Asian Yacht Builder at the Asia Boating Awards. This was their 13th time winning the award.

See also
 List of companies of Taiwan
 Maritime industries of Taiwan
 Ta shing (yacht)
 Tayana Yachts
 Ocean Alexander
 Jade Yachts
 Johnson Yachts

References

External links

Yacht building companies
Taiwanese companies established in 1987
Shipbuilding companies of Taiwan
Manufacturing companies based in Kaohsiung
Taiwanese boat builders
Taiwanese brands